Loudi railway station is a railway station located in Loudi, Hunan, China, on the Shanghai–Kunming railway and Luoyang–Zhanjiang railway lines, which are operated by China Railway.

History
The railway station opened in 1958.

A new station started to built in November 1996, and completed in January 1999.

References

Railway stations in Hunan
Stations on the Luoyang–Zhanjiang railway
Stations on the Shanghai–Kunming Railway
Railway stations in China opened in 1958
Railway stations in Loudi